= Nirogdham Patrika =

Indian health magazine

- Editor: Ashok Kumar Pandey
- Categories: Health magazine
- Frequency: Quarterly
- Founded: 1979
- Country: India
- Based in: Indore Madhya Pradesh
- Language: Hindi
- Website: http://nirogdhampatrika.in/

Nirogdham Patrika (Hindi:निरोगधाम पत्रिका ) is a quarterly family health magazine for people published in Indore Madhya Pradesh India since 1979. At that time there were not a single health magazine into the market. Nirogdham Patrika started spreading health awareness in the country.

== History ==
Nirogdham Patrika was founded by RasVaidya Premdutt Pandey. The first edition of the magazine was released in 1979. At that time, there were not any health magazines to spread awareness in India, slowly it became one of the best selling family health magazines. At that time in 1979 the people were not aware of Ayurveda, science and its usage into life. The initiative of Nirogdham Patrika to spread the Ayurveda worked very well.

== Present ==
Nirogdham Patrika is one of the oldest selling health magazines with a readership of 20 lack approx. The magazine has both national and international demands and covers the topics like Ayurvedic medicine, yoga, homeopathy, health tips and many more.

== Facts ==
The Nirogdham Patrika have doctors which help the readers who ask questions via letter or email. Some questions are also published in the magazine.
